Kahuku High & Intermediate School, located in Kahuku CDP, City and County of Honolulu, Hawaii, United States, on the island of Oahu, serves approximately 1,850 students in grades seven through twelve and is part of the Windward District on the island of Oahu. It is a part of the Hawaii Department of Education. The students of Kahuku are enrolled from the communities of Kaaawa, Hauula, Laie, Kahuku, and Sunset Beach which span a twenty-six mile stretch along the North Shore.

Known as the "Pride of the North Shore," Kahuku High and Intermediate has academic and athletic programs and a Music Learning Center that features band and choral music which have garnered state and national recognition.

The campus has a bronze sculpture, Spirit of Kahuku, by Jan Gordon Fisher and Bruce Brown.

Kahuku High School Red Raiders football program 
In the 21st century the Kahuku Red Raiders have won a Hawai`i record ten (10) State Football Championships - most recently in November of 2022 with dominating shutout of Punahou School, 20-0. In Kahuku High School football history, four (4) head football coaches have won state football championship titles: Siuaki Livai (2000, 2001, 2003, 2005), Reggie Torres (2006, 2011, 2012),, Vavae Tata (2015) and most recently Sterling Carvahlo (2021 and 2022). , .  

With the rare defensive shutout in the championship game, the 2022 Red Raiders earned back-to-back state football champions for the first time since 2011-2012. Sterling Carvalho joins former Red Raider alumni and previous Kahuku head football coaches Reginald "Reggie" Torres and Siuaki Livai as the only coaches to lead Kahuku to a state football championship in consecutive seasons. Additionally, the Kahuku Red Raiders have won all four state-final meetings against Punahou School and its 30 victories in the state HHSAA tournament are a record in the high school sport of American football in Hawai`i. 

The Red Raiders have won or shared the Oahu Interscholastic Association (OIA) Public school championship title 29 times since the inception of OIA in 1940. 
 Kahuku High School's football team also has been nationally ranked multiple times in numerous high school football opinion polls and rankings even before winning their first Hawai`i High School Athletic Association (HHSAA) State Football Championship in 2000. Kahuku High School football program's highest ranking came at the end of the 2001 football season when they were ranked #8 in the Super 25 High School Football rankings and #13 in the StudentSports.com rankings.

Notable alumni

Notable alumni include
Camila Ah Hoy - Hafoka, Head Women's Volleyball Coach at Utah Tech. University
Dr. Robert Anae, Offensive Coordinator at Syracuse University
Alexander Bonde, German politician
Ry Bradley, country singer 
Sam Choy, chef
Eni F.H. Faleomavaega, congressman
Salu Hunkin-Finau, educator and politician  
Jack Johnson, singer/songwriter
Natasha Kai, 2008 Olympian for the United States Gold medal-winning Women's National Soccer Team
Alopati Albert "Al" Lolotai, first Samoan Athletic Director at Church College of Hawai`i (Now BYU-Hawai`), First player from Kahuku School (they did not have a High School until 1939), First Iolani School graduate, the First Weber State University (then called Weber Junior College) football player, First University of Hawai`i-Manoa football player, First football player of Samoan ancestry and First Polynesian football player ever to play professional American football in the National Football League NFL in 1945.
Leo Reed, labor leader, served as Hollywood's Teamsters Local 399’s top officer for 24 years, served as the head of the International Brotherhood of Teamsters’ Motion Picture & Theatrical Trades Division and he was the first Kahuku High School Graduate to play professional football.  [Note: Kahuku's High School was created in 1939 and began playing organized OIA sports - including American football -  shortly thereafter just prior to World War II. This new high school built upon on the foundation established by Kahuku Elementary ("English School") School, which started in 1893. Kahuku did not have official organized interscholastic sports prior to 1940 - when the OIA was officially created.  ] , .
Tanoai Reed, Actor and Hollywood stunt man - primarily for Duane "The Rock" Johnson
Makua Rothman, world champion surfer

Professional football players

Former Kahuku High School football players who have played in the National Football League (NFL)
(In alphabetical order)

Al Afalava, Chicago Bears, Indianapolis Colts, and Tennessee Titans
Bradlee Anae, Dallas Cowboys and New York Jets
Toniu Fonoti, San Diego Chargers, Minnesota Vikings, and Jacksonville Jaguars
Aaron Francisco, Indianapolis Colts, Carolina Panthers, and Arizona Cardinals
Alohi Gilman, San Diego/LA Chargers
Lakei Heimuli, Chicago Bears
Chris Kemoe`atu, Pittsburgh Steelers
Ma'ake Kemoe`atu, Washington Redskins, Carolina Panthers, and Baltimore Ravens
Hau'oli Kikaha - Jamora, New Orleans Saints and XFL's Dallas Renegades
Alopati Albert "Al" Lolotai, Washington Redskins and Los Angeles Dons
Timote "Tim" Manoa, Cleveland Browns and Indianapolis Colts
Stan Mataele, Tampa Bay Buccaneers and Green Bay Packers
Itula Mili, Seattle Seahawks 
Chris Nae`ole, New Orleans Saints and Jacksonville Jaguars
Leo T. Reed, Drafted by the Saint Louis Cardinals, Played for the Houston Oilers and Denver Broncos of the NFL; later played for the Indianapolis Warriors of the United Football League, and the Toronto Argonauts of the CFL 
Manti Te`o, San Diego Chargers and New Orleans Saints
Uani Devin 'Unga, New York Giants

Former Kahuku Football players who were invited to NFL Training Camps or on NFL Practice Squads:

Miki "Junior" Ah You, Hawai`i Sports Hall of Fame Member - Ah You was drafted by the New England Patriots and Played in the CFL ,  (see below)
Tala Esera, Miami Dolphins and Indianapolis Colts
Palauni Ma Sun, Washington Redskins practice squad and Arena Football League's Chicago Rush and Spokane Shock
Fa`aesea Ma`ilo, New York Jets
Jonathan "JT" Mapu, Washington Redskins
Tevita Ofahengaue, 2001 NFL's Mr. "Irrelevant", Arizona Cardinals and Jacksonville Jaguars
Kautai Olevao, Tennessee Titans and Arena Football League's Utah Blaze
Leonard Peters, Jr., Chicago Bears
E.J. Reid, Saint Louis Rams 
Kona Schwenke, Kansas City Chiefs, New England Patriots, New York Jets, Oakland Raiders, Seattle Seahawks
Suaesi Tuimaunei, Atlanta Falcons
Tavo Tupola, Houston Texans

Former Kahuku HS football players who played in other Professional American Football Leagues

Harland Ah You, Canadian Football League's (CFL) Calgary Stampeders
Miki "Junior" Ah You, CFL Hall of Fame, CFL's Montreal Alouettes, USFL's Chicago Blitz, USFL's New Orleans Breakers, and USFL's Arizona Outlaws  
Brad Anae, United States Football League's (USFL) Philadelphia Stars, USFL's Houston Gamblers, and the USFL's San Antonio Gunslingers
Robert Anae, (Drafted by the USFL's New Jersey Generals in 1985, the last year of the USFL before it shut down.)

Head Football Coaches who attended or graduated from Kahuku High School 

 Donny Atuaia, Timpview High School (UT) Head Football Coach and Kahuku alum 
 Darren "DJ" Johnson, Campbell High School (HI) Head Football Coach and former Kailua High School Head Football Coach and Kahuku alum
 Siuaki Livai, Former Kahuku High School Head Football Coach and Kahuku alum
 Kautai Olevao, Highland High School (UT) head football coach and Kahuku alum 
 David "Kawika" Stant, Keio Unicorns (Japanese Football League), Kamehameha Schools Head Football Coach and Kahuku alum 
 Alema Te`o, Head Football Coach at Alta High School (UT) and Kahuku alum  , 
 Reginald "Reggie" Torres, Former Kahuku High School Head Football Coach and Kahuku alum

References

External links
 kahukuhigh.org

Public middle schools in Honolulu County, Hawaii
Public high schools in Honolulu County, Hawaii
1897 establishments in Hawaii
Educational institutions established in 1897